Donghu may refer to:

Donghu District (东湖区), in Nanchang, Jiangxi, China
Donghu Subdistrict, Beijing (东湖街道), in Chaoyang District, Beijing, China
Donghu Station (Taipei Metro)
East Lake (Wuhan) or Donghu, a large lake in Wuhan, China, and the national park around it
East Lake Triangle Pool or East Lake, two small lakes in Haikou, China
Donghu people, historical name for the Proto-Mongolic nomadic ethnic group whose descendants included the Wuhuan, Xianbei, and Rouran peoples